Asmoredjo is an Indonesian surname. Notable people with the surname include:

Djufrie Asmoredjo, Indonesian politician
Reinier Asmoredjo (born 1962), Surinamese painter

Indonesian-language surnames